These are the results of 2019 BWF World Senior Championships' 60+ events.

Men's singles

Seeds 
  Dan Travers (silver medalist)
  Arnold Dendeng (gold medalist)
  Yuri Smirnov (bronze medalist)
  Per Juul (bronze medalist)
  Tariq Farooq (fourth round)
  Ong Then Lin (fourth round)
  Loke Poh Wong (quarterfinals)
  Chan Wan Seong (second round)
  Rolf Rüsseler (fourth round)
  Cheddi Liljeström (second round)
  Chongsak Suvanich (fourth round)
  Rick Paap (third round)
  Eric Plane (second round)
  Birger Steenberg (fourth round)
  Vladimir Koloskov (second round)
  Sergey Bushuev (quarterfinals)

Finals

Top half

Section 1

Section 2

Section 3

Section 4

Bottom half

Section 5

Section 6

Section 7

Section 8

Women's singles

Seeds 
  Heidi Bender (silver medalist)
  Svetlana Zilberman (gold medalist)
  Kuniko Yamamoto (bronze medalist)
  Christine Black (quarterfinals)

Finals

Top half

Section 1

Section 2

Bottom half

Section 3

Section 4

Men's doubles

Seeds 
  Eric Plane / Roger Taylor (second round)
  John Molyneux / Ian M. Purton (bronze medalists)
  Vladimir Koloskov / Yuri Smirnov (second round)
  Tariq Farooq /  Karsten Meier (quarterfinals)
  Chan Wan Seong / Ong Then Lin (quarterfinals)
  Sergey Bushuev /  Mirza Orujov (second round)
  Per Juul / Birger Steenberg (silver medalists)
  Jesper Helledie /  Dan Travers (gold medalists)

Finals

Top half

Section 1

Section 2

Bottom half

Section 3

Section 4

Women's doubles

Seeds 
  Heidi Bender /  Svetlana Zilberman (gold medalists)
  Sugako Morita / Kukiko Yamamoto (silver medalists)
  Jenny Cox / Christine M. Crossley (bronze medalists)
  Anne C. Bridge / Christina Davies (bronze medalists)

Finals

Top half

Section 1

Section 2

Bottom half

Section 3

Section 4

Mixed doubles

Seeds 
  Ian M. Purton / Christine M. Crossley (gold medalists)
  Dan Travers / Christine Black (silver medalists)
  Jens Dall-Hansen / Birte Bach Steffensen (quarterfinals)
  Toshio Kawaguchi / Masuyo Namura (second round)
  Ong Then Lin /  Yu Xiaomin (quarterfinals)
  Jeffrey Jamin Zee /  Kuniko Yamamoto (quarterfinals)
  James Buckle / Anne C. Bridge (quarterfinals)
  Philip Ian Richardson / Jackie Hurst (bronze medalists)

Finals

Top half

Section 1

Section 2

Bottom half

Section 3

Section 4

References 
Men's singles
Women's singles
Men's doubles
Women's doubles
Mixed doubles

2019 BWF World Senior Championships